Thomas Michael Marvaso (born October 2, 1953) is a former American football defensive back in the National Football League (NFL) who played for the New York Jets. He played college football at University of Cincinnati where he was a first-team all-american selection. He ranks 4th all time for punt return touchdowns, and is a member of the Bearcat ring of honor.

References 

Living people

Cincinnati Bearcats football players

1953 births
American football defensive backs
New York Jets players